The Forest of Arden Hotel & Country Club is a hotel and country club complex in England.

The Forest of Arden has two golf courses, the Arden and the Aylesford, both of which were designed by Donald Steel, and a golf academy. The Arden is the championship course, and has been the venue for many prestigious tournaments, including European Tour events, the British Masters on three occasions, and the English Open four times between 1993 and 1996.

References

External links
Forest of Arden, A Marriott Hotel & Country Club – official site
Forest of Arden Country Club – official golf site

Golf clubs and courses in Warwickshire
Sports venues in Warwickshire